The Austrian Open is a men's professional golf tournament on the European Tour. It was founded in 1990, and was a European Tour event for seven straight years up to 1996, being held under a variety of names due to regular changes of title sponsor. The tournament dropped down to the Challenge Tour schedule between 1997 and 2005, with a sharp reduction in prize money, before returning to the main tour for the 2006 season. In 2012, it was announced that the Austrian shopping community Lyoness and its affiliated Greenfinity foundation would be the title sponsors for three seasons. 

The 2018 event was the first professional tournament to use a shot clock on every shot. The official European Tour time allowances were used: a 50-second allowance for a “first to play approach shot (including a par three tee shot), chip or putt” and a 40-second allowance for a “tee shot on a par four or par five, or second or third to play approach shot, chip or putt”. Players that failed to play within these time limits incurred a one-shot penalty, which was added to their score for that hole. Players had two “time-extensions” in each round, each giving them an extra 40 seconds.

Since 2010 the tournament has been held at the Diamond Country Club in Atzenbrugg, Lower Austria, 35 km west of Vienna.

In 2020, the tournament was a dual-ranking event with the Challenge Tour, due to a revamp of the European Tour's schedule because of COVID-19 pandemic.

Winners

Notes

References

External links
Coverage on the European Tour's official site

Former European Tour events
Golf tournaments in Austria
Recurring sporting events established in 1990
1990 establishments in Austria